Guía de Isora is a municipality in the western part of the island of Tenerife, one of the Canary Islands, and part of the Province of Santa Cruz de Tenerife. The population is 20,537 (2013), and the area is 143 km. The town Guía de Isora is 5 km from the coast, 16 km northwest of Arona and 60 km southwest of the island's capital Santa Cruz de Tenerife.

Historical population

References 

Municipalities in Tenerife